Estadio Diego Armando Maradona is a stadium located in the district of Villa General Mitre, Buenos Aires, Argentina. It is the home venue of club Argentinos Juniors, and has a capacity of 26,000.

It was given its name in 2004 in honour of former Argentinos player Diego Maradona (1960–2020) who made his professional debut here in 1976, following the refurbishment of the ground, and to celebrate the club's centenary year.

History 

Before the construction of this stadium, there was another one on the same place, wooden made, which first opened in 1940. Since it was small and unsafe, it was left apart in the early 1980s, and the football team moved its basis to the nearer Arquitecto Ricardo Etcheverri stadium, in the neighbourhood of Caballito. The idea was to build a modern and bigger stadium with the 5,800,000 dollars that the club received from the transfer of Diego Armando Maradona to the FC Barcelona but finally that money was invested in constructing other venues at the multisport complex Las Malvinas, owned by the same club, and in bringing some first level footballers in order to succeed at the national championship. The project of the new stadium had to wait until the next decade.

In 1995, the old stadium was demolished, but at the same time a deep economic crisis hit the club and continued for a long time, delaying the works for eight years. Finally, in 2003, the new stadium was finished, and opened on December 26. Six months later, the team returned to the Argentinean First Division, where it is now based. The opening ceremony included two football games between the 1984 team, that won the first national championship for the club versus the team that won the second division tournament in 1997, and another one between the Argentinean U-20 national team and a mix of some of the best players born in the club's youth divisions such as Juan Pablo Sorín, Esteban Cambiasso, Diego Placente, Carlos Mac Allister, Claudio Borghi, Fabricio Coloccini, Leonel Gancedo and Sergio Batista together with some other remarkable footballers that played in Argentinos, such as Ubaldo Fillol. 

At the end of 2003 works concluded, after several interruptions for economic reasons, since the stadium was built with genuine money paid into the club and not by companies or donations, as some versions wanted to indicate, reopening with a great party on December 26 of that year, with 30,000 people in the stands to watch how a team of Argentinos Juniors' former players of the 1985 Copa Libertadores winning team against the squad that achieved promotion to Primera División in 1997, plus a match between the U20 Argentinos Juniors vs a combined of past club legends from the youth academy including Esteban Cambiasso, Juan Pablo Sorín and Claudio Borghi. The aforementioned teams were managed, respectively, by Roberto Saporiti, Osvaldo Chiche Sosa, José Pekerman, and Hugo Tocalli, all of them former players or coaches of the club and identified with it.

Lionel Messi made his debut with the Argentina U20 national team in this stadium and scored his first international goal in a friendly match against Paraguay on 29 June 2004.

References

External links

 

Estadio Diego Armando Maradona
Sports venues in Buenos Aires
D
Sports venues completed in 2003
Estadio